Kevin Thomas Barry (born August 18, 1978) is an American former right-handed pitcher for the Atlanta Braves and current area scout for the Braves.  Additionally, Barry is currently employed as a police officer for Kinmundy, Illinois.

Barry grew up in the Princeton Junction section of West Windsor Township, New Jersey and is a graduate of West Windsor-Plainsboro High School South.

He was drafted by the Braves in the 14th round of the 2001 draft. He has played with the Myrtle Beach Pelicans and the Richmond Braves. Barry was one of two pitchers (Chuck James being the other) called up from the Braves farm system after the release of Mike Remlinger.

He made his major league debut on June 26, 2006, against the New York Yankees and subsequently and surprisingly struck out Jason Giambi.

Barry is currently working for the Atlanta Braves Organization as an area scout.  He has held this role since 2009.

References

External links

1978 births
Living people
Águilas del Zulia players
Atlanta Braves players
Atlanta Braves scouts
Baseball players from New Jersey
Greenville Braves players
Jamestown Jammers players
Major League Baseball pitchers
Mesa Solar Sox players
Mississippi Braves players
Myrtle Beach Pelicans players
People from Monmouth County, New Jersey
People from West Windsor, New Jersey
Richmond Braves players
Rider Broncs baseball players
Sportspeople from Mercer County, New Jersey
Tiburones de La Guaira players
American expatriate baseball players in Venezuela
West Windsor-Plainsboro High School South alumni